The 1966 Miami Hurricanes football team represented the University of Miami as an independent during the 1966 NCAA University Division football season. Led by third-year head coach Charlie Tate, the Hurricanes played their home games at the Miami Orange Bowl in Miami, Florida. Miami finished the season with a record of 8–2–1 and a victory in the Liberty Bowl over Virginia Tech.

Schedule

Roster
 Ted Hendricks, So.

Game summaries

at Colorado

Florida State

Georgia

USC

Iowa

at Florida

Team players drafted into the NFL

References

Miami
Miami Hurricanes football seasons
Liberty Bowl champion seasons
Miami Hurricanes football